WLXK (88.3 FM) is a radio station broadcasting a Contemporary Christian format airs the K-LOVE programming format from Rocklin, California.  Previously, it simulcasted WRCM in Wingate, North Carolina when it was owned by Columbia International University. Licensed to Boiling Springs, North Carolina, United States, the station is currently owned by the Educational Media Foundation.

Gardner–Webb University radio station WGWG signed on in 1974 with beautiful music and "The Afternoon Rock Show". The signal increased to 50,000 watts in 1994. Streaming began in 1998. By 1999, the format included music performed live in the studio, talk shows, and high school football. The music format changed from adult album alternative  in 2010. Gardner–Webb announced the sale of the 88.3 frequency and the move by the radio station to online-only June 28, 2013.

On October 6, 2014, it was announced that then-WRZM, along with WRCM and its translators, were being sold to EMF Broadcasting. The deal closed on December 19, 2014, a day later than expected because of last-minute legal issues. WRCM's General Manager Joe Paulo signed the station off as a local broadcasting entity with a prayer and Chris Rice's rendition of "Great Is Thy Faithfulness" at 4:32 p.m. At that point, WRCM and WRZM flipped its programming to the national K-LOVE network.

K-LOVE later changed the call letters of WRZM to WLXK later that year, which is now known as "K-Love Greenville-Spartanburg".

References

External links

K-Love radio stations
Educational Media Foundation radio stations
LXK